The western fire-eye (Pyriglena maura) is an insectivorous bird in the antbird family Thamnophilidae.
It is found in Ecuador, Peru, Colombia,  Bolivia, and Brazil.

Its natural habitats are subtropical or tropical dry forests, subtropical or tropical moist lowland forests, and subtropical or tropical moist montane forests.

Description 
The western fire-eye has a length from beak to tail of 16-18 cm and weighs in at 26-36 grams on average, with variation depending on sex. Both sexes have bright red eyes with black pupils.  A partially concealed white patch is visible on the lower mantle of the back. The white patch reveals itself when the western fire-eye is startled or threatened. The males of the species are primarily glossy black with a more greyish underwing. The females have various appearances based on their subspecies. The females from the subspecies Pacifica are brown with a desaturated olive-brown underbelly and underwing. From the Castanoptera subspecies the females have a black body and head with a dark redish brown color on their wings and mantle. The Picea females are brown with a darker head. Marcapatensis and Hellmayri females have an olive upper body with lighter underparts as well as a white supercilium, or small streak above the eye, and white beneath the eye with black coloring between.

Diet 
Both males and females commonly feed on orthopterans, arachnids, centipedes, lizards up to 11 cm, and occasionally slugs. To catch its prey, the Western fire-eye hops off a low perch and seizes its target before normally returning to another low perch. Smaller prey is usually eaten whole, however if the prey is larger it may take it to a peripheral area of the ground to peck and tear it apart so it can be eaten. Occasionally, the western fire-eye may spend more time on the ground while perch gleaning if the prey is partially concealed by vegetation.

Breeding 
There is very little information concerning the incubation, brooding, and feeding patterns of the western fire-eye when concerning the young. However, it is known that nesting, specifically in Brazil, is done in all months of the year. Nesting peaks between the months of August and November and there is very little nesting in the early dry seasons between the middle of May and middle of August. Nests are most commonly made on the ground to be concealed by vegetation and are primarily made by the males of the species with the females helping towards the latter end of its formation.

Vocal Behavior 
The western fire-eye has a song that consists of short “chirp” notes and long bursts and whistles, with their song possibly differentiating based on location or subspecies. The females and males of the species have differing songs, with the males’ song typically rising and falling in pitch and intensity. The males song lasts roughly two seconds, with the females song typically lasting longer and being of a higher pitch.

Conservation Status 
The western fire-eye has not had its conservation status reassessed since the discovery that it was not the same species as the Tapajos fire-eye (Pyriglena similis)  and the East Amazonian fire-eye (Pyriglena leuconata). However, the region that the western fire-eye primarily resides in is largely made up of protected areas and the western fire-eye is noted to persist to older second growth compared to many other forest dwelling birds.

References

 

Western fire-eye
Western fire-eye